Gran Hotel (English: Grand Hotel) is a 1944 Mexican film directed by Miguel M. Delgado, starring Cantinflas.

Plot
Cantinflas is a tramp who is evicted for not paying the rent. After wandering, he gets a job at the "Gran Hotel" through a friend, where he is confused with the Duke of Alfanje, who is incognito in the hotel, and the theft of a jewel complicates the situation more.

Cast
Cantinflas as Cantinflas / El Treece
Jacqueline Dalya as Mrs. White
Josefina Martínez as Carmelita
Luis G. Barreiro as Sr. Garnier
Fernando Soto as Compadre
Vicente Padula as Conde Zapattini
Conchita Gentil Arcos as Doña Estefania
Rafael Icardo as Señor Polilla
Luz María Núñez as Eloisa
Ángel T. Sala as Agente secreto en hotel
Carlos Villarías as Don Pepe
Roberto Meyer as Agente de procuraduria
Roberto Corell as Maître
Estanislao Schillinsky as Recepcionista de hotel
Carolina Barret as Vecina (uncredited)
Roberto Cañedo as Cliente restaurante (uncredited)
Fernando Curiel as Agente de policía (uncredited)
Pedro Elviro as Botones (uncredited)
Edmundo Espino as Vecino en posada (uncredited)
Magdalena Estrada as Vecina en posada (uncredited)
Isabel Herrera as Vecina en posada (uncredited)
Raúl Lechuga as Duque de Alfanje / Empleado de hotel (uncredited)
Ernesto Monato as Julio, cliente de hotel (uncredited)
Rosa María Montes as Esposa de Julio (uncredited)
José Pardavé as Vecino en posada (uncredited)
José Pulido as Anunciador restaurante (uncredited)
Joaquín Roche as Doctor (uncredited)
Irma Torres as Vecina en posada (uncredited)
Armando Velasco as Don Fulgencio (uncredited)

References

Bibliography
 Stavans, Ilan. The Riddle of Cantinflas: Essays on Hispanic Popular Culture, Revised and Expanded Edition. UNM Press, 2012.
 Balderston, Daniel; González, Mike; López, Ana M. Encyclopedia of Contemporary Latin American and Caribbean Cultures. Routledge, 2002.

External links
 

1944 films
1944 comedy films
Mexican comedy films
1940s Spanish-language films
Films directed by Miguel M. Delgado
Mexican black-and-white films
1940s Mexican films